Tammi Musumeci (born July 8, 1994) is an American submission grappler and black belt Brazilian jiu-jitsu competitor. A multiple times world champion in colored belts, Musumeci is a black belt world champion, a four-time No-Gi world champion and a two-time Pan American champion.

Biography 
Born on July 8, 1994, in New Jersey, Musumeci began training in Brazilian Jiu-Jitsu when she was six years old. After a successful competitive career in the colored belt divisions, having won the World Jiu-Jitsu Championship at every belt level, and with three Pan American titles (two at purple belt and one at brown), Musumeci was promoted to black belt in 2013 by Emyr "Shark" Bussade.

During her first year as a black belt, 19 years old Musumeci won the 2013 IBJJF World No-Gi Brazilian Jiu-Jitsu Championship, then won gold again in 2015 and 2016. Musumeci added two IBJJF Pan Championship gold medals in 2014 and 2017. Her silver medal in the 2016 edition of the tournament solidified her reputation as one of the most relentless and fearless competitors in the sport.

After defeating two former world champions to reach the 2016 Pan Finals, Musumeci lost to BJJ legend Michelle Nicolini in a memorable match during which Musumeci refused to tap to an armlock that eventually dislocated her arm. In 2019, Musumeci became world champion for the first time, having reached the final in 2014 and medalled twice previously. At the 2021 World Jiu-Jitsu Championship Musumeci won Silver after losing the Light-feather final by decision to Ana Rodrigues. At the 2022 World Jiu-Jitsu Championship Musumeci won silver in the light feather division.

As training partners, Tammi and her brother Michael "Mikey" Musumeci have won a combined 9 International Brazilian Jiu-Jitsu Federation World Championship titles in gi and no-gi competition.

Outside of jiu-jitsu, Musumeci is an attorney, having graduated from the William S. Boyd School of Law at the University of Nevada, Las Vegas in 2020.

ONE Championship
Musumeci is scheduled to make her promotional debut against Bianca Basílio on March 25, 2023, at ONE Fight Night 8.

Brazilian Jiu-Jitsu competitive summary 
Main Achievements at black belt level:
 IBJJF World Champion (2019)
 IBJJF Pan Champion (2014 / 2017)
 IBJJF World No-Gi Champion (2013 / 2015 / 2016 / 2022)
 2nd Place IBJJF World Championship  (2014 / 2021 / 2022)
 2nd Place IBJJF World Championship No-Gi (2018)
 2nd Place IBJJF Pan Championship (2016)
 3rd Place IBJJF World Championship (2016 / 2017)

Main Achievements at colored belts:
 IBJJF World Jiu-Jitsu Champion (2010 blue)
 IBJJF Pan No-Gi Champion (2010 blue)
 IBJJF  Pan Jiu-Jitsu Champion (2011 purple)
 IBJJF  Pan No-Gi Champion (2011 purple)
 IBJJF  World No-Gi Champion (2011 purple)
 IBJJF  Pan Jiu-Jitsu Champion (2012 purple)
 IBJJF  World Jiu-Jitsu Champion (2012 purple)
 IBJJF  Pan Jiu-Jitsu Champion (2013 purple)
 IBJJF  World Jiu-Jitsu Champion (2013 purple)

Instructor lineage  
Mitsuyo Maeda → Carlos Gracie → Carlson Gracie → Ricardo Libório → Emyr Bussade → Tammi Musumeci

Notes

References 

1994 births
Living people
American practitioners of Brazilian jiu-jitsu
People awarded a black belt in Brazilian jiu-jitsu
World No-Gi Brazilian Jiu-Jitsu Championship medalists
Brazilian jiu-jitsu world champions (women)
Female Brazilian jiu-jitsu practitioners
People from Marlboro Township, New Jersey
Sportspeople from Monmouth County, New Jersey